The Sony Cyber-shot DSC-HX50 is a hyperzoom camera with 30x optical zoom, released in 2013.

Features
 Wide-angle lens
 20.4 megapixel resolution
 Optical image stabilizer in the lens, reducing blurring by compensating for hand shake—10 fps continuous shooting
 Double the 30x optical zoom range to an effective 60x with Clear Image Zoom (reduced picture quality)
 5 cm minimum focusing distance
 Full HD 1080p movie mode in both normal and wide aspect ratio
 "Intelligent Sweep Panorama"
 As with most Sony Cyber-shot cameras it uses a BIONZ engine
 Built-in Wi-Fi
 Multi Interface Shoe for flash, electronic viewfinder or microphone
 Battery lasts for approx. 400 pictures, charging inside the camera (via miniUSB)
 AF system (without spot) 
 Dust + push- sensitive objective

The Cyber-shot DSC-HX50/-(V)/-(VB) release to the USA was announced in 2013. The camera is the successor of the Sony DSC HX30/-(V)/-(VB) and been replaced by the Sony DSC HX60/-(V)/-(VB).

Photo gallery

Camera

Examples

External official infos

 Data sheet

References

HX50
Superzoom cameras
Cameras introduced in 2013